The Bhutan Tiger Force (BTF) is the armed wing of the Communist Party of Bhutan (Marxist–Leninist–Maoist) (CPB (MLM)).

History 
On 13 December 2007, the BTF injured a refugee at the Beldangi I camp near Sangam Chowk in Damak, Nepal.

On 23 April 2008, a bomb planted by BTF rebels was defused near a bridge in Phuntsholing. 

On 30 December 2008, BTF insurgents attacked six forest rangers in Singye village after they set off a BTF landmine, killing four and injuring another in the whole engagement. The BTF insurgents also took some of the forest rangers’ weapons.

References

Citations

Sources 
 Bhutan Assessment 2008 South Asian Terrorism Portal
 Country profile: Bhutan BBC News
 Yearender : Part I Kuensel Online (Bhutan).  18 February 2008.

Communism in Bhutan
Far-left politics
Terrorism in Bhutan
Military wings of communist parties
Republicanism in Bhutan
Communist terrorism
Communist militant groups
Paramilitary organisations based in Bhutan
Maoism in Asia
Maoist organizations